Tabea Schmid (born 14 August 2003) is a Swiss female handballer for LC Brühl Handball in the Spar Premium League and the Swiss national team.

Schmid made her official debut on the Swiss national team on 20 March 2021, against Faroe Islands. She represented Switzerland for the first time at the 2022 European Women's Handball Championship in Slovenia, Montenegro and North Macedonia.

Achievements
 SPAR Premium League
Bronze Medalist: 2022

References

External links

2003 births
Living people
Swiss female handball players
People from St. Gallen (city)
21st-century Swiss women